Kenneth Stanley Murray Jr. (April 20, 1928 – June 15, 2008) was an American professional basketball player. Murray was selected in the fourth round of the 1950 NBA Draft by the Chicago Stags after a collegiate career at St. Bonaventure. In the 1950–51 season he was selected as an NBA All-Star alternate for the Eastern Conference while playing for the Baltimore Bullets.

References

1928 births
2008 deaths
American men's basketball players
Baltimore Bullets (1944–1954) players
Basketball players from New Jersey
Chicago Stags draft picks
Fort Wayne Pistons players
People from West Orange, New Jersey
Philadelphia Warriors players
Shooting guards
Sportspeople from Essex County, New Jersey
St. Bonaventure Bonnies men's basketball players
Washington Capitols players